Rim Song-sim (born 6 August 1995) is a North Korean judoka. She is a bronze medalist at the Asian Games. She competed at the World Judo Championships in 2014, 2015, 2017 and 2018.

Career 

In 2018, she won one of the bronze medals in the women's 52 kg event at the 2018 Asian Games held in Jakarta, Indonesia. In 2019, she won one of the bronze medals in the women's –52 kg event at the 2019 Asian-Pacific Judo Championships held in Fujairah, United Arab Emirates.

Achievements

References

External links
 

Living people
1995 births
Place of birth missing (living people)
North Korean female judoka
Judoka at the 2018 Asian Games
Asian Games bronze medalists for North Korea
Asian Games medalists in judo
Medalists at the 2018 Asian Games
21st-century North Korean women